The Uni-Halle (university hall) is an indoor sporting arena located in Wuppertal, Germany. The capacity of the arena is 3,200 people. It is currently home to the Bergischer HC handball team.

External links 
Arena information 

Indoor arenas in Germany
Wuppertal
Sports venues in North Rhine-Westphalia
University of Wuppertal